Mavatrep (JNJ‐39439335) is a TRPV1 receptor selective competitive antagonist. It is an investigational analgesic that may be a potential treatment for analgesia and/or inflammation.

Phase I trials have been completed in healthy Japanese and Caucasian volunteers.

Potential common adverse effects include thermohypoesthesia, chills, feeling cold, and feeling hot.

Pharmacokinetics 
When administered orally once a day, mavatrep reached steady-state in healthy volunteers in approximately 14 days. It has a relatively long half life between 68–101 hours in Japanese subjects and between 82–130 hours in Caucasian subjects.

Mavatrep is largely eliminated nonrenally. Mavatrep appears to be metabolized into two primary metabolites which are also eliminated nonrenally.

References 

Ion channel blockers
Analgesics
Experimental drugs